This is a list of Royal Air Force independent Flights. An independent Flight is a military administrative structure which is used to command flying units where the number of aircraft is not large enough to warrant a fully fledged squadron.

RAF Coastal based numbered Flights 1918–1929

Royal Air Force Numbered Flights 1923–36
later Fleet Air Arm of the RAF numbered Flights.

Fleet Air Arm of the RAF numbered Flights

 No. 701 (Catapult) Flight FAA (became 701 Naval Air Squadron) (1936-39) 
 No. 702 (Catapult) Flight FAA (became 702 Naval Air Squadron) (1936-39) 
 No. 705 (Catapult) Flight FAA (became 705 Naval Air Squadron) (1936-39) 
 No. 711 (Catapult) Flight FAA (became 711 Naval Air Squadron) (1936-39) 
 No. 712 (Catapult) Flight FAA (became 712 Naval Air Squadron) (1936-39) 
 No. 713 (Catapult) Flight FAA (became 713 Naval Air Squadron) (1936-39) 

 No. 714 (Catapult) Flight FAA (became 714 Naval Air Squadron) (1936-39) 
 No. 715 (Catapult) Flight FAA (became 715 Naval Air Squadron) (1936-39) 
 No. 716 (Catapult) Flight FAA (became 716 Naval Air Squadron) (1936-39) 
 No. 718 (Catapult) Flight FAA (became 718 Naval Air Squadron) (1936-39) 
 No. 720 (Catapult) Flight FAA (became 720 Naval Air Squadron) (1936-39)

Numbered flights RAF 1940 on

A

Air Experience Flights

 1 (1958-95), 2 (1958-) , 3 (1958-) , 4 (1958-95 & 1997-) , 5 (1958-) , 6 (1958-) , 7 (1958-) , 8 (1958-) , 9 (1958-) , 10 (1958-) , 11 (1958-) , 12 (1958-96), 13 (1958-96)

Air Sea Rescue Flights

Aircraft Delivery Flights

 1 (1941-45), 2 (1941-44), 3 (1941-44), 4 (1941-45)

Anti-Aircraft Co-operation/Calibration Flights

B

Beam Approach Training Flights

 Beam Approach Calibration Flight RAF (to Blind Approach Calibration Flight) (1941-42)
 Beam Approach Training Flight RAF, Church Lawford (1942)
 Beam Approach Training Flight RAF, Nanyuki (194?-42)

Blind Approach Training Flights

 Blind Approach Calibration Flight RAF (from Beam Approach Calibration Flight) (1941)

C

Calibration Flights

Coast Defence / Co-operation Flights

 No. 1 Coast Artillery Co-operation Flight RAF (1936-37) became No. 1 Coastal Artillery Co-operation Unit RAF 
 No. 1 Coast Defence Flight, Indian Air Force Volunteer Reserve (1940-42) became No. 101 (Coast Defence) Flight, Indian Air Force 
 No. 2 Coast Defence Flight, Indian Air Force Volunteer Reserve (1940-42) became No. 102 (Coast Defence) Flight, Indian Air Force 
 No. 3 Coast Defence Flight, Indian Air Force Volunteer Reserve (1940-42) became No. 103 (Coast Defence) Flight, Indian Air Force 
 No. 4 Coast Defence Flight, Indian Air Force Volunteer Reserve (1940-42) became No. 104 (Coast Defence) Flight, Indian Air Force 
 No. 5 Coast Defence Flight, Indian Air Force Volunteer Reserve (1940-42) became No. 105 (Coast Defence) Flight, Indian Air Force 
 No. 6 Coast Defence Flight, Indian Air Force Volunteer Reserve (1940-42) became No. 106 (Coast Defence) Flight, Indian Air Force 
 No. 1 Coastal Patrol Flight RAF (1939-40) 
 No. 2 Coastal Patrol Flight RAF (1939-40) 
 No. 3 Coastal Patrol Flight RAF (1939-40) 
 No. 4 Coastal Patrol Flight RAF (1939-40) 
 No. 5 Coastal Patrol Flight RAF (1939-40) 
 No. 6 Coastal Patrol Flight RAF (1940) 
 Coastal Battery Co-operation Flight RAF (1919-21) 
 Coastal Battery Co-operation School Flight RAF (1919) became Coastal Battery Co-operation Flight RAF 
 Coast Defence Co-operation Flight RAF (1924-33) became Coast Defence Training Flight RAF
 Coast Defence Torpedo Training Flight RAF (1928) became No. 36 Squadron RAF 
 Coast Defence Training Flight RAF (1933) became No. 1 Coastal Defence Training Unit RAF 
 Coastal Reconnaissance Beaufighter Flight RAF (1933-??)

Communication Flights

Conversion Flights

Meteorological flights
 No. 1 Meteorological Flight RAF (1943) became No. 1300 (Meteorological) Flight RAF 
 No. 2 Meteorological Flight RAF (1943) became No. 1301 (Meteorological) Flight RAF 
 No. 3 Meteorological Flight RAF (1943) became No. 1302 (Meteorological) Flight RAF 
 No. 4 Meteorological Flight RAF (1943) became No. 1303 (Meteorological) Flight RAF 
 No. 401 (Meteorological) Flight RAF (1941) became No. 1401 (Meteorological) Flight RAF 
 No. 402 (Meteorological) Flight RAF (1941) became No. 1402 (Meteorological) Flight RAF 
 No. 403 (Meteorological) Flight RAF (1940-41) became No. 1403 (Meteorological) Flight RAF 
 No. 404 (Meteorological) Flight RAF (1940-41) became No. 1404 (Meteorological) Flight RAF 
 No. 405 (Meteorological) Flight RAF (1941) became No. 1405 (Meteorological) Flight RAF 
 No. 1300 (Meteorological Reconnaissance) Flight RAF (1946-47) became No. 18 Squadron RAF 
 No. 1300 (Meteorological THUM) Flight RAF (19??-46) became No. 1300 (Meteorological Reconnaissance) Flight RAF 
 No. 1300 (Meteorological) Flight RAF (1943-??) became No. 1300 (Meteorological THUM) Flight RAF 
 No. 1301 (Meteorological) Flight RAF (1943-46 & 1949-51) 
 No. 1302 (Meteorological) Flight RAF (1943-46) 
 No. 1303 (Meteorological) Flight RAF (1943-46) 
 No. 1361 (Meteorological) Flight RAF (1946) 
 No. 1362 (Meteorological) Flight RAF (1946 & 1955-58) 
 No. 1363 (Meteorological) Flight RAF (1946) 
 No. 1364 (Meteorological) Flight RAF (1946) 
 No. 1401 (Meteorological) Flight RAF – combined with 1403 to form 521 Squadron in 1942. Reformed in 1943. (1941-42 & 1943-46) 
 No. 1402 (Meteorological) Flight RAF (1941-45 & 1946-46) 
 No. 1403 (Meteorological) Flight RAF (1941-42 & 1943) became No. 520 Squadron RAF 
 No. 1404 (Meteorological) Flight RAF (1941-43) became No. 517 Squadron RAF 
 No. 1405 (Meteorological) Flight RAF (1941-42) 
 No. 1406 (Meteorological) Flight RAF (1941-43) became No. 519 Squadron RAF 
 No. 1407 (Meteorological) Flight RAF (1941-44) became No. 521 Squadron RAF 
 No. 1408 (Meteorological) Flight RAF (1941-42) 
 No. 1409 (Meteorological) Flight RAF (1943-45) became No. 1409 (Long Range Meteorological Reconnaissance) Flight RAF 
 No. 1411 (Meteorological) Flight RAF (1942-43) 
 No. 1412 (Meteorological) Flight RAF (1942-46) 
 No. 1413 (Meteorological) Flight RAF (1942-46) 
 No. 1414 (Meteorological) Flight RAF (1941-46) 
 No. 1415 (Meteorological) Flight RAF (1942-46) 
 No. 1560 (Meteorological) Flight RAF (1942-45) 
 No. 1561 (Meteorological) Flight RAF (1943-45 & 1945-46) 
 No. 1562 (Meteorological) Flight RAF (1943-45 & 1945-46) 
 No. 1563 (Meteorological) Flight RAF (1942-46) 
 No. 1564 (Meteorological) Flight RAF (1943-46) 
 No. 1565 (Meteorological) Flight RAF (1943-46) 
 No. 1566 (Meteorological) Flight RAF (1943-46) 
 No. 1567 (Meteorological) Flight RAF (1943-46) 
 No. 1568 (Meteorological) Flight RAF (1944-46) 
 No. 1569 (Meteorological) Flight RAF (1944-45) 
 Air Ministry Meteorological Flight Aldergrove (1936-39) became 'C' Flight, Station Flight Aldergrove 
 Meteorological Flight RAF, Heliopolis (1941-42) became No. 1411 (Meteorological) Flight RAF 
 Meteorological Flight RAF, Khartoum (1941-42) became No. 1412 (Meteorological) Flight RAF 
 Meteorological Flight RAF, Ramleh (1941-42) became No. 1413 (Meteorological) Flight RAF 
 Meteorological Research Flight RAF (1946-2001) 
 Royal Air Force Meteorological Flight Eastchurch, Duxford and Mildenhall (1924-41) became No. 401 (Meteorological) Flight RAF 
 Temperature and Humidity Flight RAF (1951-58) 
 Transport Command Meteorological Flight RAF (19??)

Seaplane Training Flights

 'A', 'B', 'C', 'D', 'E', 'F', 'G'

 Seaplane Flight RAF, Basra (1928-29)

Ferry flights

Specific Aircraft Type Flights

Special Flights
Special Duty/Duties

Other Special flights

Miscellaneous Flights

Target Towing Flights

 No. 1 RAF Regiment Anti-Aircraft Practice Camp Target Towing Flight (1943) became No. 1625 (Anti-Aircraft Co-operation) Flight RAF 
 No. 2 RAF Regiment Anti-Aircraft Practice Camp Target Towing Flight (1943) became No. 1626 (Anti-Aircraft Co-operation) Flight RAF 
 No. 3 RAF Regiment Anti-Aircraft Practice Camp Target Towing Flight (1943) became No. 1627 (Anti-Aircraft Co-operation) Flight RAF 
 No. 4 RAF Regiment Anti-Aircraft Practice Camp Target Towing Flight (1943) became No. 1628 (Anti-Aircraft Co-operation) Flight RAF 
 No. 5 RAF Regiment Anti-Aircraft Practice Camp Target Towing Flight (1943) became No. 1629 (Anti-Aircraft Co-operation) Flight RAF 
 No. 6 RAF Regiment Anti-Aircraft Practice Camp Target Towing Flight (1943) became No. 1630 (Anti-Aircraft Co-operation) Flight RAF 
 No. 7 RAF Regiment Anti-Aircraft Practice Camp Target Towing Flight (1943) became No. 1631 (Anti-Aircraft Co-operation) Flight RAF 
 No. 8 RAF Regiment Anti-Aircraft Practice Camp Target Towing Flight (1943) became No. 1632 (Anti-Aircraft Co-operation) Flight RAF 
 No. 1 RAF Regiment School Target Towing Flight (1942-43) became No. 1634 (Anti-Aircraft Co-operation) Flight RAF 
 No. 3 RAF Regiment School Target Towing Flight (1942-43) became No. 1634 (Anti-Aircraft Co-operation) Flight RAF 
 No. 1 Target Towing Flight RAF (19??-42) became Air Defence Co-operation Unit RAF 
 No. 1 Target Towing Flight (India) RAF (1947) 
 No. 2 Target Towing Flight (India) RAF (1947) 
 Target Towing Flight RAF, Nicosia (19??-50) became Middle East Air Force Target Towing Unit RAF 
 Target Towing Flight RAF, Shallufa RAF (1953-54) became Middle East Air Force Target Towing Unit RAF 
 No. 1 Towed Target Flight RAF (1939-42) became Air Defence Co-operation Unit RAF 
 Base and Target Towing Flight, Royal Air Force Maintenance Base (Far East), Seletar RAF (1953-??) 
 Middle East Air Force Target Towing Flight RAF (1952-56) 
 Station and Target Towing Flight RAF, Seletar (1951-53) became Base and Target Towing Flight, Royal Air Force Maintenance Base (Far East), Seletar RAF 
 Towed Target Flight RAF, Bentwaters (1945) 
 Towed Target Flight RAF, Changi (1962-64) became No. 1574 (Target Facilities) Flight RAF 
 Towed Target Flight RAF, Gibraltar (1953-58) 
 Towed Target Flight RAF, Helwan (1940) 
 Towed Target Flight RAF, Ismailia (1935) 
 Towed Target Flight RAF, Khartoum (1935) 
 Towed Target Flight RAF, St. Eval (1953-55) 
 Towed Target Flight RAF, Schleswigland (1953-58) 
 Towed Target Flight RAF, Seletar (1951) 
 Towed Target Flight RAF, Sutton Bridge (1940) 
 Towed Target Flight RAF, Tangmere (1950-51)

See also

Royal Air Force

List of Royal Air Force aircraft squadrons
List of Royal Air Force aircraft independent flights
List of conversion units of the Royal Air Force
List of Royal Air Force Glider units
List of Royal Air Force Operational Training Units
List of Royal Air Force schools
List of Royal Air Force units & establishments
List of RAF squadron codes
List of RAF Regiment units
List of Battle of Britain squadrons
List of wings of the Royal Air Force
Royal Air Force roundels

Army Air Corps

List of Army Air Corps aircraft units

Fleet Air Arm

List of Fleet Air Arm aircraft squadrons
List of Fleet Air Arm groups
List of aircraft units of the Royal Navy
List of aircraft wings of the Royal Navy

Others

List of Air Training Corps squadrons
University Air Squadron
Air Experience Flight
Volunteer Gliding Squadron
United Kingdom military aircraft serial numbers
United Kingdom aircraft test serials
British military aircraft designation systems

References

Citations

Bibliography

 Sturtivant, Ray, ISO and John Hamlin. RAF Flying Training and Support Units since 1912. Tonbridge Wells, Kent, UK: Air-Britain (Historians) Ltd., 2007. .

Flights
Royal Air Force aircraft independent Flights